Cyrtonota sexpustulata is a leaf beetle belonging to the family Chrysomelidae.

Description
Body is dark bluish or black with six orange-red spots on the elytrae. The main host plant is Ipomoea batatas (Convolvulaceae).

Distribution
This species can be found in Brazil.

References

Cassidinae
Beetles described in 1781